Dustin Lance Black (born June 10, 1974) is an American screenwriter, director, producer, and LGBT rights activist. He is known for writing the film Milk, for which he won the Academy Award for Best Original Screenplay in 2009. He has also subsequently written the screenplays for the film J. Edgar and the 2022 crime miniseries Under the Banner of Heaven.

Black is a founding board member of the American Foundation for Equal Rights and writer of 8, a staged reenactment of the federal trial that led to a federal court's overturn of California's Proposition 8.

Early life
Black's father Raul Garrison walked out on his polio-stricken mother, Roseanna, and his two brothers, Marcus Raul and Todd Bryant, when he was young. They grew up in a Mormon household, first in San Antonio, Texas, before moving to Salinas, California.

Growing up in his family's Mormon culture and living on military bases, Black worried about his sexuality. When he found himself attracted to a boy in his neighborhood at the age of six or seven, he told himself "I'm going to hell. And if I ever admit it, I'll be hurt, and I'll be brought down". He says that his "acute awareness" of his sexuality made him dark, shy, and at times suicidal. He came out in his senior year of college.

While attending North Salinas High School, Black began to work in theater at The Western Stage in Salinas and later worked on productions including Bare at Hollywood's Hudson Main Stage Theater. Black attended the University of California, Los Angeles, School of Theater, Film, and Television (UCLA) while apprenticing with stage directors, taking acting jobs, and working on theater lighting crews. He graduated with honors in 1996.

Career

In 2000, Black wrote and directed The Journey of Jared Price, a gay romance film, and Something Close to Heaven, a gay coming-of-age short film. In 2001, he directed and was a subject in the documentary On the Bus about a Nevada road trip and adventure at Burning Man taken by six gay men. Raised as Mormon, he was hired as the only such writer on the HBO drama series Big Love about a polygamous family. He served on season one as a staff writer, executive story editor in season two, and was promoted again, to co-producer, for season three.

Black first visited San Francisco in the early 1990s, while AIDS was devastating the city's gay community. Black said that, "Hearing about Harvey was about the only hopeful story there was at the time." He had first viewed Rob Epstein's documentary The Times of Harvey Milk when he was in college, and thought, "I just want to do something with this, why hasn't someone done something with this?" Researching Milk's life for three years, Black met with Milk's former aides Cleve Jones and Anne Kronenberg, as well as former San Francisco Mayor Art Agnos, and began to write a feature film screenplay encompassing the events of Milk's life. The screenplay was written on spec, but Black showed the script to Jones, who passed it on to his friend Gus Van Sant, who signed on to direct the feature. Black is an old friend of Milk producer Dan Jinks, who signed on to the biopic after he called Black to congratulate him and discovered that the project did not have a confirmed producer.

Black's film Pedro, profiling the life of AIDS activist and reality television personality Pedro Zamora, premiered at the 2008 Toronto International Film Festival.

On February 22, 2009, Black won the Oscar for Best Original Screenplay for Milk at the 81st Academy Awards. He wore a White Knot to the ceremony as a symbol of solidarity with the marriage equality movement.

On October 11, 2009, Black marched in the National Equality March and delivered a speech in front of the United States Capitol to an estimated crowd of 200,000 LGBT rights activists.

In 2010, Black directed his own script Virginia, starring Jennifer Connelly.

Also in 2010, Black narrated 8: The Mormon Proposition, a documentary about the involvement of the Church of Jesus Christ of Latter-day Saints (LDS) in California's Proposition 8. Black accepted the award for best documentary for 8: The Mormon Proposition at the GLAAD Media awards in San Francisco and spoke out on discrimination in the LDS Church and meeting with the church to make it more LGBT-inclusive.

Black wrote the screenplay for J. Edgar, a biographical drama released November 11, 2011, directed by Clint Eastwood and starring Leonardo DiCaprio.

In 2011, Black wrote the play 8, which portrays the actual events in the Hollingsworth v. Perry trial and the testimony which led to the overturn of California's Proposition 8. He created the play in response to the federal court's refusal to allow release of video recordings from the trial and to give the public a true account of what transpired in the courtroom. It is written and performed using original transcripts from the trial and journalist records, along with first-hand interviews of the people involved. 8 first opened at the Eugene O'Neill Theatre in New York City on September 19, 2011, and later broadcast to a worldwide audience on YouTube from the Ebell of Los Angeles Theatre on March 3, 2012.

The American Foundation for Equal Rights (AFER) and Broadway Impact, sponsors of 8, have released and licensed the play for readings nationwide on college campuses and in community theaters free of charge.

Black appears as himself in the documentary film Hollywood to Dollywood (originally released in 2011).

Black published his autobiography Mama's Boy: A Story From Our Americas in 2019.

Paris Barclay was slated to direct Black's screenplay A Life Like Mine.

From 2007 to 2011, Gus Van Sant was set to direct a film adaptation of Tom Wolfe's book The Electric Kool-Aid Acid Test, for a time working with Black.

Personal life
Black was the top entry on a list of openly gay influential people in The Advocates "Forty under 40" issue of June/July 2009. He was featured on the cover of the magazine. He was one of the Official Grand Marshals in the 2009 NYC LGBT Pride March, produced by Heritage of Pride joining Anne Kronenberg and Cleve Jones.

On January 24, 2012, Black's brother, Marcus, died of cancer.

Black started a relationship with British Olympic champion Tom Daley, in spring 2013; they live in Southwark, London. In October 2015 it was announced that they had become engaged, and in May 2017 they married at Bovey Castle in Devon.

On February 14, 2018, Black and Daley announced they were expecting their first child; in June, they announced the birth of a son (by surrogacy). Facing criticism for their choice of surrogacy, Black and Daley started a podcast in which they discussed the ethical issues surrounding surrogacy and the experience as a whole. Black and Daley do not share pictures of their son's face online or on social media accounts due to privacy concerns. Daley said, "That might change in the future, but for right now, we wanted to enjoy the first year with him."

In 2014, Black was one of eight potential commencement speakers invited by Pasadena City College, and he accepted. After school officials learned nude pictures of Black were leaked online five years prior, the college announced Black had not been officially invited and the unofficial invitation was "an honest error". After talks between Black's and PCC's attorneys, the college board of trustees apologized and formally invited him.

Filmography

Other awards
 Cinema for Peace Award for Most Valuable Movie of The Year 2009
 UCLA's Distinguished Achievement in Screenwriting award, "UCLA Festival 2009: New Creative Work," School of Theater, Film and Television, June 10, 2009, Freud Playhouse
 Distinguished Service to the LGBT Community by a UCLA Alumnus Award, 2009 UCLA LGBT Graduation Ceremony, June 13, 2009
 Bonham Centre Award, for contribution to awareness and education around issues of sexual diversity, Media.utoronto.ca, The Mark S. Bonham Centre for Sexual Diversity Studies, University of Toronto, September 27, 2011
 Human Rights Campaign, Visibility Award September 15, 2012
 Equality Arizona, The Barry Goldwater Human Rights Individual Award Sept. 2013
 Writers Guild of America West, 2018 Valentine Davies Award for Civil and Human Rights Efforts, February 11, 2018

References

Bibliography

External links

 
 American Foundation for Equal Rights
 "8" (the play) Official website
 
 Dustin Lance Black: Telling The Story Of 'J. Edgar': radio interview on Fresh Air (21 mins; 2012)

1974 births
21st-century American male writers
Activists from California
American expatriates in England
American film editors
American male screenwriters
American television writers
Best Original Screenplay Academy Award winners
Film directors from California
Film directors from Texas
Film producers from California
Film producers from Texas
Former Latter Day Saints
American gay writers
Independent Spirit Award winners
LGBT Latter Day Saints
LGBT people from California
American LGBT rights activists
American LGBT screenwriters
Living people
American male television writers
People from Salinas, California
Screenwriters from California
Screenwriters from Texas
Television producers from California
Television producers from Texas
UCLA Film School alumni
Writers Guild of America Award winners
Writers from Sacramento, California
Writers from San Antonio
American LGBT dramatists and playwrights
21st-century American screenwriters
LGBT film directors
21st-century American LGBT people